Inside I'm Singing, released in 2007, is the ninth album by Secret Garden. Unlike previous albums, Inside I'm Singing is mostly composed of vocal music. Instrumental tracks given new lyrics.

The first track, "Nocturne", won the Eurovision Contest in 1995 and also appeared on the first album Songs from a Secret Garden.

"Theme from the Mermaid Chair" was featured in the 2005 TV movie The Mermaid Chair.

"You Raise Me Up", a popular song by Secret Garden, appeared first on Once in a Red Moon with guest vocals by Brian Kennedy who also did the same work on this album.

Track listing

Charts

References

2007 albums
Secret Garden (duo) albums